Kijewice may refer to the following places:
Kijewice, Kuyavian-Pomeranian Voivodeship (north-central Poland)
Kijewice, Lubusz Voivodeship (west Poland)
Kijewice, Masovian Voivodeship (east-central Poland)